Luis Casas Pasarín (16 April 1902 – 17 August 1986) was a Spanish football defender and manager.

Playing career
Born in Pontevedra, Galicia, Pasarín started his professional career with RC Celta de Vigo. One of the club's first captains, he appeared in its first ever official tournament, the 1923 Galician Championship, which ended in conquest.

Pasarín then spent six seasons with Valencia CF, created precisely after he left Celta. His best La Liga input occurred in 1932–33 as he played 17 games, but they could only rank ninth out of ten teams, narrowly avoiding relegation. After retiring in 1935 he worked in the Ministry of Labour, but returned shortly after to play for amateurs Nacional de Madrid.

Pasarín earned six caps for Spain, and represented the nation at the 1924 Summer Olympics.

Coaching career
After the Spanish Civil War, Pasarín obtained his coaching licence. He was in charge of the national side for one game, then returned to Valencia for the 1946–47 season, leading the club to its third national championship in six years. He achieved a runner-up position the following year, trailing champions FC Barcelona by three points.

Pasarín also managed Celta in five top-flight campaigns in two separate spells, and also worked in that capacity with Real Oviedo and FC Porto (Portugal). He died on 17 August 1986 at the age of 84, in Madrid.

References

External links

CiberChe stats and bio 

1902 births
1986 deaths
Footballers from Pontevedra
Spanish footballers
Association football defenders
La Liga players
Segunda División players
RC Celta de Vigo players
Valencia CF players
Spain international footballers
Footballers at the 1924 Summer Olympics
Olympic footballers of Spain
Spanish football managers
Spain national football team managers
La Liga managers
Segunda División managers
Valencia CF managers
RC Celta de Vigo managers
CD Málaga managers
Real Oviedo managers
Granada CF managers
Real Madrid Castilla managers
Primeira Liga managers
FC Porto managers
Spanish expatriate football managers
Expatriate football managers in Portugal
Spanish expatriate sportspeople in Portugal